A constant-current diode is an electronic device that limits current to a maximal specified value for the device.  It is known as a current-limiting diode (CLD) or current-regulating diode (CRD).

It consists of an n-channel JFET with the gate shorted to the source, which functions like a two-terminal current limiter (analogous to a voltage-limiting Zener diode). It allows a current through it to rise to a certain value, but not higher.

Note that some devices are unidirectional and voltage across the device must have only one polarity for it to operate as a CLD, whereas other devices are bidirectional and can operate properly with either polarity.

Wide-bandgap materials such as silicon carbide have been used in production devices to enable high-voltage applications in the kilovolt range.

References

External links
 IEEE 315 symbol for current-regulating diode
 
Diode
 CLD diode datasheet, MCC
 CRD diode datasheet, Semitec
 J500 diode datasheet, Linear Systems / Siliconix / Vishay
 1N5283 to 1N5314 diode datasheet, Central Semiconductor

JFET
 2N5457/8/9 & MMBF5457/8/9 JFET datasheet, ON Semiconductor (Former Fairchild)

Diodes
Over-current protection devices